Off the Beaten Track is a compilation album by The Stranglers. It was released by EMI, who had acquired the back catalogues of the Strangler's former labels United Artists and Liberty. The compilation collects tracks which were originally only available as the A-side or B-sides to various 7" vinyl singles released by United Artists and Liberty.

The collection reached No. 80 in the UK Albums Chart in September 1986.

Track listing
 "Go Buddy Go" - B-side to "Peaches" (1977)
 "Top Secret" - B-side to "Thrown Away" (1981)
 "Old Codger" - B-side to "Walk On By" (1978)
 "Maninwhite" - B-side to "Just Like Nothing On Earth" (1981)
 "Rok It to the Moon" - B-side to "5 Minutes" (1978)
 "Love 30" - B-side to "Golden Brown" (1982)
 "Shut Up" - B-side to "Nice 'n' Sleazy" (1978)
 "Walk On By" - non-album single, and also from the Black and White free EP (1978)
 "Vietnamerica" - B-side to "Let Me Introduce You to the Family" (1981)
 "Mean to Me" - from the Black and White free EP (1978)
 "Cruel Garden" - B-side to "Strange Little Girl" (1982)
 "Yellowcake UF6" - B-side to "Nuclear Device (The Wizard of Aus)" (1979)
 "5 Minutes" - non-album single (1978)

Personnel
The Stranglers
 Hugh Cornwell - guitar, vocals
 Dave Greenfield - keyboards, vocals
 Jean-Jacques Burnel - bass, vocals
 Jet Black - drums, percussion
Additional musicians
 George Melly - lead vocals on "Old Codger"
 Lew Lewis - harmonica on "Old Codger"

References

1986 compilation albums
The Stranglers compilation albums
EMI Records compilation albums